Fatehgarh Sahib (station code: FGSB) is a small railway station located in Fatehgarh Sahib district in the Indian state of Punjab and serves Fatehgarh Sahib city which is the administrative headquarter of the district. Fatehgarh Sahib station falls under Ambala railway division of Northern Railway zone of Indian Railways.

The railway station 
This station is located on the single track,  broad gauge, Sirhind–Nangal line. Station was established in 1927 when Sirhind to Nangal line was opened.

Electrification 
Fatehgarh Sahib railway station line is electrified. Sections of Sirhind–Nangal line were completed and energized at various times between 1999 and 2001 and complete line from Sirhind to Nangal was tested and inspected by CRS on 24 April 2001.

Amenities 
Fatehgarh Sahib railway station has two booking windows and all basic amenities like drinking water, public toilets, sheltered area with adequate seating. There is one platform at the station.

References

External links 

 Pictures of  railway station

Railway stations in Fatehgarh Sahib district
Firozpur railway division
Fatehgarh Sahib